The Simplic was a cyclecar manufactured from 1914 onwards by George Wadden in Surrey, England. Wadden was a hairdresser who took over the business that had produced the Autotrix. The first Simplic was a 4-wheeled vehicle powered by a 5/6 hp air-cooled JAP engine. Transmission was by epicyclic gear and belt final drive. Production stopped later that year due to World War I.

Wadden redesigned the car at the end of the war, and the Simplic now featured an 8/10 hp JAP engine and twin speed chain drive. Although selling for only £185, and advertised as "Positively the best value in Cyclecars", production ended in 1923.

See also
 List of car manufacturers of the United Kingdom

References

Cyclecars
Defunct motor vehicle manufacturers of England
Defunct companies based in Surrey